Little Dreamer is an album by British blues rock musician Peter Green, who was the founder of Fleetwood Mac and a member from 1967–70. Released in 1980, this was his third solo album, and the second in his 'middle period' of the late 1970s and early 1980s.

Most of the tracks on this album were written by Green's brother Mike.

Track listing
All tracks written by Mike Green unless indicated.
"Loser Two Times" – 4:34
"Momma Don'tcha Cry" – 3:26
"Born Under a Bad Sign" (Booker T. Jones, William Bell) – 3:01
"I Could Not Ask for More" – 5:02
"Baby When the Sun Goes Down" – 5:39
"Walkin' the Road" – 3:52
"One Woman Love" – 5:34
"Cryin' Won't Bring You Back" – 5:09
"Little Dreamer" (Peter Green, Mike Green) – 7:01

Personnel

Musicians
 Peter Green – lead guitar, vocals, harmonica
 Ronnie Johnson – rhythm guitar
 Roy Shipston – organ
 Paul Westwood – bass guitar (all tracks except 5, 7)
 John 'Rhino' Edwards – bass guitar (track 5)
 Kuma Harada – bass guitar (track 7)
 Dave Mattacks – drums
 Morris Pert – percussion (tracks 1, 2, 6-9)
 Peter Vernon-Kell – piano (track 4)
 Pam Douglas – backing vocals (tracks 1, 5)
 Carol Ingram – backing vocals (tracks 1, 5)

Production
 Peter Vernon-Kell – producer
 Mike Cooper – engineer, mixing
 Bob Searles, Bernard Chandler – design

Chart performance

Album

References

Peter Green (musician) albums
1980 albums